Notre-Dame-d'Estrées-Corbon is a commune in the department of Calvados in the Normandy region in northwestern France. It was formed in January 2015 by the merger of the communes of Corbon and Notre-Dame-d'Estrées.

See also
Communes of the Calvados department

References

Communes of Calvados (department)
Populated places established in 2015